Solid Ground is the seventh studio album by the British rock band Smokie, released in 1981.

Track listing

Singles
 "Take Good Care of My Baby" (1980)
 "Jet Lagged" (1982)

References

1981 albums
Rak Records albums
Smokie (band) albums